Crazy People is an album recorded by The Rowan Brothers in 2002.
 The album cover was photographed by Peter Rowan's daughter, Amanda Rowan.

Track listing 

 "Crazy People" (Edgar/Monaco)
 "Nothin' Personal" (Rowan brothers)
 "Red Rockin'" Chair (trad.)
 "Pretty Senorita" (Peter Rowan)
 "Don't Pick the Blossom Before the Flower Grows" (Rowan brothers)
 "Free Mexican Airforce" (Peter Rowan)
 "That's Alright (Long Time)" (Rowan brothers)
 "In 1999" (Rowan brothers)
 "Shoppin' Feet' (Rowan brothers)
 "Ain't Nothin' Like a Family" (Rowan brothers)

Personnel 
 Lorin Rowan - guitar, vocals
 Peter Rowan - guitar, mandola, spoons, vocals
 Chris Rowan - guitar, vocals

with
 Sam Bush - mandolin
 Larry Atamanuik - drums
 Russell Bond - bass
 Dick Bright - violin
 Bill Amatneek - bass
 Jerry Douglas - dobro
 Dave Grant - bass
 Roy Huskey, Jr. - bass
 Bryn Bright - bass
 Flaco Jiménez - accordion
 Sergio Lara - guitar
 Edgar Meyer - bass
 Tom Mitchell - banjo
 Ethan Turner - drums
 Joe Reyes - guitar
 Mookie Siegel - accordion
 Tim O'Brien - bouzouki

References 

2002 albums
The Rowans albums